Falling Creek may refer to:

Falling Creek (Broad River tributary), a stream in Georgia
Falling Creek (James River tributary), a stream in Virginia
Falling Creek, Virginia, an unincorporated community

See also
Falling Creek Ironworks, Virginia